Gustav Unfried (24 March 1889 – 13 September 1917) was a German international footballer.

References

1889 births
1917 deaths
Association football midfielders
German footballers
Germany international footballers
BFC Preussen players
German military personnel killed in World War I